Austin Willis (born April 13, 1992) is a former American football wide receiver. He was signed as an undrafted free agent by the Oakland Raiders after the 2015 NFL Draft. He played college football at Emporia State, where he served as the running backs and strength and conditioning coach from 2017 to 2018.

Professional career

Oakland Raiders 
On May 11, 2015, Willis signed with the Oakland Raiders. On August 18, 2015, he was waived.

Buffalo Bills 
On August 22, 2015, Willis signed to the Buffalo Bills. On August 31, 2015, he was waived and on September 1, 2015, Willis cleared waivers and was placed on injured reserve with a concussion. On September 7, 2015, he was released.

Detroit Lions 
On January 21, 2016, Willis signed to the Detroit Lions. Willis was released by the Lions prior to training camp.

References

1992 births
Living people
American football wide receivers
Detroit Lions players
Emporia State Hornets football coaches
Emporia State Hornets football players
Sportspeople from Topeka, Kansas
Players of American football from Kansas